Anoviara is a commune in northern Madagascar. It belongs to the district of Andapa, which is a part of Sava Region. According to 2001 census the population of Anoviara was 10,667.

Primary and junior level secondary education are available in town. The majority 98% of the population are farmers.  The most important crop is vanilla, while other important products are coffee and rice.  Services provide employment for 2% of the population.

References and notes 

Populated places in Sava Region